Elections to the Almaty City Mäslihat were held on 10 January 2021 to elect 39 deputies of the Almaty City Mäslihat. This was the first time that all city deputies were elected under party-list proportional representation.

The Nur Otan won majority of 29 seats in the Almaty City Mäslihat followed by the other 3 parties.

Background 
In the aftermath of the 2016 City Mäslihat election, the ruling Nur Otan party members.

In 2018, the Government of Kazakhstan approved a new constitutional amendment which would allow all Mäslihat elections to be conducted through party-list proportional representation. However, the move lead for self-nominated (independent) candidates from contesting in the race as all the mäslihats (local assemblies) required its members to be affiliated registered political party.

In December 2019, the City Mäslihat during its convocation tenure unanimously voted for approval of the draft Almaty-2050 Development Strategy aimed to solve the problems in Almaty and improve lives of citizens. As a result of the COVID-19 pandemic in Kazakhstan, the city suffered setbacks in declining economy, investments, and an increase in inflation due to quarantine measures and lockdowns that were implemented. City councillor Qairat Qudaibergen was reported to have tested positive for COVID-19. In December 2020, during a briefing, Almaty äkim Bakhytzhan Sagintayev stated that the economy had stabilized and that it has a "potential for rapid recovery in the post-epidemic period."

Electoral system 
The City Mäslihat deputies are directly-elected through proportional representation for a five year term and must win the 7% electoral threshold to win any seats. If only one party manages to pass the threshold, then the other party with the second most received votes is awarded enough seats to have representations in the City Mäslihat.

Parties 
5 parties submitted their list to the Territorial Election Commission of the Almaty City, which included:

Results 
The Nur Otan won 68.1% of the vote, gaining a majority of 29 seats in the City Mäslihat. The other 3 contesting parties for the seats managed to enter the City Mäslihat, except for the Adal which narrowly missed the 7% electoral threshold to win any seats.

References 

Elections in Almaty
2021 elections in Kazakhstan
January 2021 events in Kazakhstan